Desert Rats vs. Afrika Korps, released as Afrika Korps vs. Desert Rats outside the UK and U.S., is a real-time tactics game that is based on the North African campaign of World War II. The single player missions are playable as the German Afrika Korps or the British Desert Rats. There is also an option for online multiplayer.

Gameplay

Reception

The game received "average" reviews according to the review aggregation website Metacritic.

See also
D-Day

References

External links

2004 video games
Cultural depictions of Erwin Rommel
Video games about Nazi Germany
Windows games
Windows-only games
World War II video games
Video games developed in Hungary
Video games set in Egypt
Video games set in Libya
Real-time tactics video games
War video games set in the British Empire
Atari games
Digital Reality games
Multiplayer and single-player video games
Encore Software games